Bainchan is a very small village in the Hoshiarpur District in the Indian state of Punjab.

External links
 District web site
 Municipal Council,Hoshiarpur

Villages in Hoshiarpur district